The 1962 Texas Longhorns baseball team represented the University of Texas at Austin in the 1962 NCAA University Division baseball season. The Longhorns played their home games at Clark Field. The team was coached by Bibb Falk in his 20th season at Texas.

The Longhorns reached the College World Series, finishing third with losses to eventual champion Michigan and runner-up Santa Clara.

Personnel

Roster

Schedule and results

References

Texas Longhorns baseball seasons
Texas Longhorns
Southwest Conference baseball champion seasons
College World Series seasons
Texas Longhorns